The name Max has been used for five tropical cyclones in the Eastern Pacific Ocean and for one in the Australian region of the Indian Ocean.

In the Eastern Pacific:
 Tropical Storm Max (1981)
 Hurricane Max (1987) –  Category 4 hurricane, churned in the open ocean
 Tropical Storm Max (1993)
 Hurricane Max (2005) – Category 1 hurricane, no threat to land
 Hurricane Max (2017) – Category 1 hurricane, made landfall in southwestern Mexico

In the Australian region:
 Cyclone Max (1981) – Category 3 tropical cyclone, crossed the Top End of Australia's Northern Territory, then moved west out to sea

Australian region cyclone set index articles
Pacific hurricane set index articles